The Obama Effect is a 2012 American comedy-drama film directed by Charles S. Dutton and starring Dutton, Katt Williams and Vanessa Bell Calloway.

Cast
Charles S. Dutton as John Thomas
Katt Williams as MLK
Vanessa Bell Calloway as Molly Thomas
Glynn Turman as Slim Sugar
Meagan Good as Tamika Jones
John Diehl as Steve Warren
Zab Judah as Jamel Thomas
CJ Mac as Joshua
Reggie Brown as Barack Obama

References

External links
 
 

American comedy-drama films
2012 comedy-drama films
2012 films
Films directed by Charles S. Dutton
2010s English-language films
2010s American films